George Vernon (1575/6–1639), of the Inner Temple, London and Haslington, Cheshire, was an English politician.

He was a Member (MP) of the Parliament of England for Bridgnorth in 1625 and 1626.

1570s births
1639 deaths
English MPs 1625
English MPs 1626
People from Cheshire
Members of the Inner Temple